South Carolina Highway 9 Connector may refer to:

South Carolina Highway 9 Connector (Jonesville), a connector route in Jonesville
South Carolina Highway 9 Connector (Lake View), a connector route in Lake View

009 Connector
009 Connector